Manhattan Manhunt may refer to:

 "Manhattan Manhunt" (CSI: NY episode), a crossover between CSI: Miami and CSI: NY
 "Manhattan Manhunt", an episode of McCloud